Progreso Independent School District is a public school district based in Progreso, Texas (USA).

In addition to Progreso, the district also serves the city of Progreso Lakes.

In 2009, the school district was rated "academically acceptable" by the Texas Education Agency.

The Texas Education Agency's college readiness performance data shows that only 4% (5 out of 98 students) of the graduates of the class of 2010 of the Progreso school district met TEA's average performance criterion on SAT or ACT college admission tests.

Schools
Progreso High School (Grades 9-12)
The school mascot is the red ant (the only school in Texas with this mascot)
Dorothy Thompson Middle School (Grades 6-8)
Progreso Elementary School (Grades 1-6)
Progreso Early Childhood Center (Grades PK-K)

References

External links

 

School districts in Hidalgo County, Texas